Imam Hussein Mosque, in Midan Hawalli District, Kuwait City, is the largest Shi'a mosque in Kuwait. Its prayer hall accommodates about 4,000 to 5,000 men and 500 to 1,000 women. The mosque was built in 1986. It was unharmed in the 1990 invasion of Kuwait.

See also
Mosque
Shi'a Islam
List of mosques

References 

1986 establishments in Kuwait
Buildings and structures in Kuwait City
Mosques completed in 1986
Shia mosques in Kuwait